The Morgan Hill Times is a weekly newspaper in Morgan Hill, California. It is Morgan Hill’s oldest continually operating business, tracing its history back to the Morgan Hill Sun, founded by George Edes on April 12, 1894.

History
A dozen years after its founding, a second paper, The Times, began publishing. Shortly thereafter, the two papers were combined under the name of The Sun-Times. Following the turn of the century, The "Sun" was dropped from the name and the paper has continued as the Morgan Hill Times to the present.

The Morgan Hill Times was purchased by The McClatchy Company on July 1, 1979 from Welton L. Pollard. In 1996, McClatchy announced it was selling its South Valley newspapers. The company would “no longer own small newspapers unless they are in markets adjacent to their large papers," Publisher Paula Mabry said.

On February 28, 1997, McClatchy sold the Dispatch, along with the Hollister Free Lance, the Morgan Hill Times and the Amador Ledger, for $6.7 million to Independent Newspapers Ltd. of New Zealand. McClatchy’s filing with the U.S. Security and Exchange Commission reported a combined daily circulation of approximately 10,150, weekly circulation of 12,800 and $7.5 million in annual revenues for the year preceding the sale. Independent’s largest shareholder was Australia-based News Ltd., controlled by billionaire publisher Rupert Murdoch.

The New Zealand group sold the papers in 1998 to Central Valley Publishing Holdings, Inc., an operator of 30 small market papers that was based in Festus, Missouri. Michigan publishers Anthony Allegretti and Steve Staloch gained control of Central Valley's assets in a 2004 private equity-backed management buyout, assembling a group that included community newspapers in San Diego County, Santa Cruz and California's Central Valley. 
 The Times and its sister papers were acquired by the Mainstreet Media Group, LLC  from Pacific Sierra Publishing Company in 2004.

In 2014, MainStreet sold its Northern California papers, including the Morgan Hill Times and Gilroy Dispatch, to Metro Newspapers.

Awards

The Morgan Hill Times was named the best small non-daily newspaper in California in 2002, winning the General Excellence category in the California News Publishers Association contest that year amongst non-daily newspapers with circulation of 4,300 or less.

The Morgan Hill Times won a first place California Journalism Award for breaking Breaking News for coverage by Michael Moore, Erik Chalhoub, Scott Forstner and Jaqueline McCool of the 2019 Ford Store shooting. Judges called it, “Community news reporting at its best. ...Went far beyond a recap or chronology.”

In 2020, the Times received California Journalism Awards for a news photo and for “Coverage of the COVID-19 Pandemic” by Michael Moore, Erik Chalhoub and Emanuel Lee, with judges saying “Strong community reporting. Stories are clearly written and provide much needed information.”

References

External links

Publications established in 1895
1895 establishments in California
Weekly newspapers published in California